Karl Jørgensen  (12 June 1890 – 26 February 1966) was a Danish stage and film actor.

Selected filmography
Vesterhavsdrenge – 1950
Støt står den danske sømand – 1948
Penge som græs – 1948
Tre år efter – 1948
Lykke på rejsen – 1947
Ditte Menneskebarn – 1946
Affæren Birte – 1945
De røde enge – 1945
Frihed, lighed og Louise – 1944
Besættelse – 1944
Når man kun er ung – 1943
Damen med de lyse handsker – 1942
Alle mand på dæk – 1942
Regnen holdt op – 1942
Thummelumsen – 1941
Tror du jeg er født i Gaar! – 1941
Hallo! Afrika forude! – 1929
Kys, klap og kommers – 1929
Kongen af Pelikanien – 1928
Kraft og skønhed – 1928
Vester Vov-Vov – 1927
Grænsefolket – 1927
Raske Riviera Rejsende – 1924
 Blandt byens børn – 1923

External links

Danish male stage actors
Danish male film actors
Danish male silent film actors
20th-century Danish male actors
1890 births
1966 deaths
Place of birth missing
Place of death missing